Many fandoms in popular culture have their own names that distinguish them from other fan communities. These names are popular with singers, music groups, films, authors, television shows, books, games, sports teams, and actors. Some of the terms are coined by fans while others are created by celebrities themselves.

The trend of giving a name to a groups of fans became more common and widespread during the beginning of the 21st century, with the development of social media, although such names were incidentally used much earlier.

#

A

B

C

D

E

F

G

H

I

J

K

L

M

N

O

P

Q

R

S

T

U

V

W

X

Y

Z

See also 
 Honorific nicknames in popular music

References 

Fandom